Paul Helminger (28 October 1940 – 16 April 2021) was a Luxembourgish politician who was Mayor of Luxembourg City from 1999 to November 2011. He was a member of the Chamber of Deputies for the Democratic Party (from 1994 to 2012, and previously from 1984 until 1989).

Biography 

Born in Esch-sur-Alzette in 1940, Paul Helminger moved with his family to Belair, a quarter in western Luxembourg City, when he was one year old. After he attained his baccalaureate in the Athénée de Luxembourg in 1959, Helminger went on to study law at the Sorbonne in Paris until 1963. At the same time, he also studied at the Institut d'Études Politiques and attained a degree in international relations in 1963. In 1964, he finished his doctorate in jurisprudence, before moving to the United States to finish his studies in political science at Stanford University.

Helminger started to work in diplomacy for the state of Luxembourg in 1966 and represented the country in London, Helsinki and Geneva, until 1974, when Prime Minister Gaston Thorn made him his Chief of Cabinet.

In the Werner-Thorn Ministry, he was from 1979 to 1984 Secretary of State for external relations, development aid and economy.

He was deputy from 1984 to 1989, and again from 1994 to 2012.

Since 1987, Helminger was also member of the city council of Luxembourg City. He became alderman in 1991 and mayor in 1999. On 21 November 2011, he presided over the city council for the last time, retiring in favour of Xavier Bettel. Helminger received a standing ovation for his excellent work as mayor of the city. 
In 2012, Helminger was appointed Chairman of the Board of Directors of Luxair, the Luxembourgish national flag carrier, a post he held until 2019 when he was succeeded by Giovanni Giallombardo.

He died on 17 April 2021 at the age of 80.

Private life 

Paul Helminger was married and had seven children. He was president of the Luxembourg Tennis Federation from 1994 to 2003.

|-

External links 
 Biography on dp.lu for the 2009 election campaign (German)
 Curriculum Vitae on the homepage of Luxembourg city (French)

References

Mayors of Luxembourg City
Members of the Chamber of Deputies (Luxembourg)
Members of the Chamber of Deputies (Luxembourg) from Centre
Councillors in Luxembourg City
Democratic Party (Luxembourg) politicians
1940 births
2021 deaths
People from Esch-sur-Alzette
Alumni of the Athénée de Luxembourg
Presidents of the Luxembourg Tennis Federation